Čukljenik may refer to:

 Čukljenik (Niška Banja), a village in Serbia
 Čukljenik (Leskovac), a village in Serbia